Don H. Doyle is an American historian author. He specializes in Civil War history and historiography. He is well known for his books Faulkner's County: The Historical Roots of Yoknapatawpha and The Cause of All Nations: An International History of the American Civil War.

Life and career
He completed his BA from the University of California, Davis and his PhD from Northwestern University. Doyle is currently the McCausland Professor of History at the University of South Carolina.

He has spent several years teaching and researching in Europe and Latin America. He is also a Public Policy Scholar at the Woodrow Wilson International Center for Scholars. He was appointed a Fellow of the National Humanities Center in Research Triangle Park, North Carolina.

Bibliography
One of his books was reviewed by the Wall Street Journal and the New York Times.

Some of books are:

 The Cause of All Nations: An International History of the American Civil War
 New Men, New Cities, New South: Atlanta, Nashville, Charleston, Mobile, 1860–1910 
 Nations Divided: America, Italy, and the Southern Question
 Nashville Since the 1920s
 Secession as an International Phenomenon: From America's Civil War to Contemporary Separatist Movements
 The Social Order of a Frontier Community: Jacksonville, Illinois, 1825–70
 Nashville in the New South, 1880–1930
 Faulkner's County: The Historical Roots of Yoknapatawpha

References

External links
 

Year of birth missing (living people)
Living people
21st-century American historians
American male non-fiction writers
University of California, Davis alumni
Northwestern University alumni
University of South Carolina faculty
21st-century American male writers